Butterworth may refer to:

Places
 Butterworth (ancient township), a former township centred on Milnrow, in the then Parish of Rochdale, England, United Kingdom
 Butterworth, Eastern Cape, now also known as Gcuwa, a town located in South Africa
 Butterworth, Penang, the principal town of Seberang Perai in the state of Penang, Malaysia
 RMAF Butterworth, air base near Butterworth, Penang, Malaysia
 Butterworth, Ohio, a ghost town, United States
 Butterworth, Virginia, unincorporated community, United States

People
 Butterworth (surname), including a list of people with the name

Other uses
 Aston Butterworth, British racing car constructor
 Butterworth filter, a type of electronic filter design, eponym of Stephen Butterworth
 LexisNexis Butterworths, publisher
 Mrs. Butterworth's, a brand of pre-packaged syrups and pancake mixes
 Butterworth (1785 ship), originally a privateer, then a whaler
 Butterworth Squadron, flotilla of whaling ships organised around Butterworth

See also